The North Channel is the body of water along the north shore of Lake Huron, in the Canadian province of Ontario. It stretches approximately 160 nautical miles (300 km) and is bordered on the east by Georgian Bay, on the west by the St. Marys River, to the north by the eastern Algoma District and part of the Sudbury District, and to the south by the islands of Manitoulin, Cockburn, Drummond and St. Joseph.  At its widest point it is over 30 km (20 miles) wide.

In addition to Georgian Bay, the North Channel is connected to the main body of Lake Huron by the False Detour Channel and the Mississagi Strait, which separate the above-noted islands.

The channel is recognized as one of the best freshwater cruising grounds in the world.  There are full-service marinas in various small communities along the shore providing sufficient provisions.  A large section of the north shore is bordered by La Cloche Provincial Park providing for a scenic environment.

The only road crossings of the North Channel are at the Little Current Swing Bridge, which carries Highway 6 between Manitoulin Island and the mainland of Northern Ontario, and the Bernt Gilbertson Bridge, which carries Highway 548 from the mainland onto St. Joseph Island. The bridges are located at two of the narrowest points along the entire channel.

The North Channel lies under the jurisdiction of the Georgian Bay Land Trust. The Georgian Bay Land Trust is an organization which seeks to preserve land of ecological, geological, and historical importance.

The communities on the mainland side of the North Channel, between the townships of Tarbutt and Nairn and Hyman, are commonly grouped as the North Shore region. This designation does not generally include the communities on St. Joseph or Manitoulin islands.

Waterways within North Channel

 Izaak Walton Bay
 Lake Nicolet
 Sturgeon Bay

References

Landforms of Algoma District
Landforms of Manitoulin District
Lake Huron
Bodies of water of Ontario
Channels of Canada